The 2016 Porsche Mobil 1 Supercup was the 24th Porsche Supercup season. It began on 13 May at Circuit de Catalunya and finished on 23 October at Circuit of the Americas, after ten scheduled races, all of which were support events for the 2016 Formula One season.

Teams and drivers
Full list of drivers that participated in the 2016 season:

Race calendar and results

Championship standings

Drivers' Championship

Notes
† – Drivers did not finish the race, but were classified as they completed over 75% of the race distance.

^ – Drivers took part in the races with different competiotionnumber

Notes

References

External links
 
 Porsche Mobil 1 Supercup Online Magazine

Porsche Supercup seasons
Porsche Supercup